Zavareh Var (also Romanized as Zavāreh Var) is a village in Behnamarab-e Jonubi Rural District, Javadabad District, Varamin County, Tehran Province, Iran. At the 2006 census, its population was 966, in 244 families.

References 

Populated places in Varamin County